Symphlebia ipsea is a moth in the family Erebidae. It was described by Herbert Druce in 1884. It is found in Panama.

References

Moths described in 1884
ipsea